Matrimonial Chaos is a 2018 South Korean television series starring Cha Tae-hyun, Bae Doona, Lee El and Son Suk-ku. It is a remake of the 2013 Japanese TV series of the same title, broadcast by Fuji TV. It aired on KBS2's Mondays and Tuesdays at 22:00 KST time slot from October 8 to November 27, 2018.

Synopsis
It explores the different thoughts of men and women in their thirties about love, marriage and family in a modern age when divorce is more common.

Cast

Main
 Cha Tae-hyun as Jo Seok-moo (36 years old), a somehow stubborn husband who enjoys spending time alone.
 Bae Doona as Kang Hwi-roo (35 years old), opposite to her husband Seok-moo, she seems an easygoing but self-centered and sloppy woman, who prefers to take things at a slower pace.
 Lee El as Jin Yoo-young (36 years old), Jang-hyun's wife is an introvert, but reliable and smart person. She is Seok-moo's first love. 
 Son Suk-ku as Lee Jang-hyun (36 years old), a charismatic man who apparently is loved by many women, but in fact always feels alone.

Supporting

Seok-moo's family
 Moon Sook as Go Mi-sook (76 years old), Seok-moo's grandmother.
 Choi Jung-woo as Jo Koo-ho (64 years old), Seok-moo's father.
 Nam Gi-ae as Baek Mi-yeon (61 years old)
 Yoon Hye-kyung as Jo Seok-young (41 years old), Seok-moo's older sister.
 Jung Ji-soon as Go Myung-geun (45 years old), Seok-young's husband.
 Go Jae-won as Go Sung-bin (10 years old), Seok-young's child.

Hwi-roo's family
 Yoo Hyung-gwan as Kang Chu-wol (62 years old), Hwi-roo's father.
 Hwang Jung-min as Lee Jong-hee (59 years old), Hwi-roo's mother.
 Kim Hye-jun as Kang Ma-ru (29 years old), Hwi-roo's younger sister.
 Ha Yoon-kyung as Joo Soo-kyung (29 years old)

Others
 Wi Ha-joon as Im Shi-ho (29 years old)
 Shin Sung-min as Baek Chan-jin (29 years old)
 Song Ji-ho as Nam Dong-gu (28 years old)
 Kim Chae-eun as Song Mi-ri (28 years old)
 Seo Yoon-ah as Song Eun-joo (25 years old)
 Kim Ga-ran as Sung Na-kyung (27 years old)
 Choi Woo-ri as Yoo Ji-hyun (39 years old)
 Shin Song-min as Baek Min-seop (47 years old)
 Gong Sung-ha
 Lee Young-jin as Jang Se-jin
 Im Kang-sung as Chief Department
 Shim Eun-woo as So Se-jin (17 years old)

Production
The first script reading of the cast was held on July 23, 2018 at KBS Annex Building.

Original soundtrack

Part 1

Part 2

Part 3

Part 4

Part 5

Part 6

Ratings

Awards and nominations

Notes

References

External links
  
 
 
 

Korean Broadcasting System television dramas
Korean-language television shows
2018 South Korean television series debuts
2018 South Korean television series endings
South Korean romance television series
South Korean romantic comedy television series
South Korean television series based on Japanese television series
Television series by Monster Union